The 1973 World Championship Tennis circuit was one of the two rival professional male tennis circuits of 1973. It was organized by World Championship Tennis (WCT). In April 1972 WCT signed an agreement with the International Lawn Tennis Federation (ILTF) as a result of which the 1973 men's tennis season was divided in a WCT section, which ran from January until May, and a Grand Prix circuit which was held from May onward. The WCT circuit divided the players into two groups of 32 players, with each group playing 11 tournaments of the 22 tournaments. The four highest ranked players from each group qualified for the season finals in Dallas. The total available prize money was almost $1,250,000.

Schedule

Key

January

February

March

April

May

Statistical information

Titles won by player

Key

Titles won by nation

Key

Standings

Key

See also
 1973 Grand Prix circuit
 1973 USLTA Indoor Circuit

Notes

References

External links
 ATP 1973 results archive

 
World Championship Tennis circuit seasons
World Championship Tennis